A Tribute to John Fahey is a tribute album to guitarist John Fahey released in 1979. It is noteworthy in that, unlike subsequent Fahey tribute albums, it was recorded during his lifetime.

All the performers were then on Kicking Mule Records, a label co-founded by ED Denson, former Takoma Records co-founder and friend of Fahey.

Track listing

References

External links
Stefan Wirz discography page for Kicking Mule Records

John Fahey (musician) tribute albums
Folk compilation albums
1979 compilation albums
Kicking Mule Records albums